The Osos de Manatí are a professional basketball team based in Manatí, Puerto Rico, that competes in the Baloncesto Superior Nacional (BSN), the top division of basketball in Puerto Rico. Prior to 2017 the team was named Atenienses de Manatí. In October 2022 they returned to the top flight, following their promotion and Brujos de Guayama's relegation.

Home arenas

 Juan Cruz Abreu Coliseum (2014–2017)

Players

References

External links
 Baloncesto Superior Nacional

BSN teams
Manatí, Puerto Rico